Louis Riesterer was a Swiss footballer who played for FC Basel as a forward. He also acted many year as referee.

Between the years 1915 and 1920 Riesterer played a total of 11 games for Basel but never scored a goal. Two of these games were in the Swiss Serie A and the other were friendly games. Riesterer's first league match for the club was on 12 March 1916. It was the 46th city derby between BSC Old Boys and FC Basel. The home team, Old Boys, won the game 3–2.

Louis Riesterer was referee for many years. The earliest noted game with Riesterer as referee was the test match  FC Basel against Stuttgarter Kickers on 30 August 1913.

References

Sources
 Rotblau: Jahrbuch Saison 2017/2018. Publisher: FC Basel Marketing AG. 
 Die ersten 125 Jahre. Publisher: Josef Zindel im Friedrich Reinhardt Verlag, Basel. 
 Verein "Basler Fussballarchiv" Homepage

FC Basel players
Swiss men's footballers
Association football forwards
Swiss football referees